Bashar Srour (born 30 November 1972) is a former Syrian footballer who played for Syria national football team.

References

External links
worldfootball.net
11v11.com

1972 births
Syrian footballers
Living people
Syria international footballers
Place of birth missing (living people)
Hutteen Latakia players
Tishreen SC players
Association football defenders
Syrian Premier League players